The men's ISSF 50 meter pistol was a shooting sports event held as part of the Shooting at the 1948 Summer Olympics programme. It was the seventh appearance of the event. The competition was held on 2 August 1948 at the shooting ranges at London. 50 shooters from 22 nations competed. Nations had been limited to three shooters each since the 1932 Games. The event was won by Edwin Vásquez of Peru in the nation's debut in the free pistol. Vásquez is still (through the 2020 Games) the only Peruvian athlete to win a gold medal at an Olympic Games. Rudolf Schnyder of Switzerland took silver. Defending champion Torsten Ullman of Sweden earned bronze, the second man to win multiple medals in the event.

Background

This was the seventh appearance of the ISSF 50 meter pistol event. The event was held at every Summer Olympics from 1896 to 1920 (except 1904, when no shooting events were held) and from 1936 to 2016; it was nominally open to women from 1968 to 1980, although very few women participated these years. A separate women's event would be introduced in 1984. 1896 and 1908 were the only Games in which the distance was not 50 metres; the former used 30 metres and the latter 50 yards.

Four of the top 10 shooters from the 1936 Games returned despite the 12-year hiatus: gold medalist Torsten Ullman of Sweden, fourth-place finisher Marcel Bonin of France, seventh-place finisher Georgios Stathis of Greece, and ninth-place finisher Sándor Tölgyesi of Hungary. Ullman was the reigning world champion as well, having regained the title in 1947 after coming second in 1937 to break a streak of three victories in 1933, 1935, and 1937. Oscar Bidegain of Argentina had been the runner-up in 1947.

Cuba, Lebanon, Peru, Puerto Rico, and Spain each made their debut in the event. Greece and the United States each made their sixth appearance, tied for most of any nation.

Vásquez used a Hämmerli MP33.

Competition format

The competition had each shooter fire 60 shots, in 6 series of 10 shots each, at a distance of 50 metres. The target was round, 50 centimetres in diameter, with 10 scoring rings. Scoring for each shot was up to 10 points, in increments of 1 point. The maximum score possible was 600 points. The time limit for each series of 10 shots was 20 minutes. Any pistol was permitted. Ties were broken first by bulls-eyes (7s and above), then by 10s, then by 9s, etc.

Records

Prior to this competition, the existing world and Olympic records were as follows.

No new world or Olympic records were set during the competition.

Schedule

Results

The three-way tie for second was broken first by bulls-eyes (7s and above, the middle 20 cm diameter); Benner had 58 while Schnyder and Ullman had both put all 60 shots in the target area, so the American placed fourth and the other two continued to the next tie-breaker. There, the advantage went to Schnyder with 21 10s against Ullman's 16.

References

Shooting at the 1948 Summer Olympics
Men's 1948